Flekkefjord Dampskipsselskap AS is a Norwegian shipping company that operates the Kvellandstrand–Launes Ferry and the Abelnes–Andabeløy Ferry outside Flekkefjord in Agder, Norway. The company is a subsidiary of Norled (previously Tide Sjø).

References

Ferry companies of Agder
Flekkefjord